Hélder Pelembe (born 20 September 1987) is a Mozambican professional footballer who plays for Mozambican club UD Songo as a forward.

Club career
After playing two years apiece in his country with Clube Ferroviário de Nampula and C.D. Maxaquene, in June 2010, Pelembe signed with Portimonense S.C. from Portugal, with the Algarve club freshly returned to the Primeira Liga. He made his debut in the competition on 13 August, playing the full 90 minutes in a 1–3 home loss against S.C. Braga.

After Portimonense's immediate relegation – with the player contributing with no goals, in only three starts – Pelembe returned to Mozambique and Maxaquene. In 2013, he joined fellow Moçambola side Liga Muçulmana de Maputo.

In December 2013, Pelembe moved to South African side Orlando Pirates on a three-year contract.

In January 2018, he moved to UD Songo, where he was part of their Confederation Cup campaign.

International goals
Scores and results list Mozambique's goal tally first.

References

External links
 
 
 

1987 births
Living people
Mozambican footballers
Mozambique international footballers
Association football forwards
Primeira Liga players
Clube Ferroviário de Nampula players
C.D. Maxaquene players
Portimonense S.C. players
Liga Desportiva de Maputo players
Orlando Pirates F.C. players
Bloemfontein Celtic F.C. players
Baroka F.C. players
UD Songo players
2010 Africa Cup of Nations players
Mozambican expatriate footballers
Expatriate footballers in Portugal
Expatriate soccer players in South Africa
People from Nampula Province